The Journal of Computing in Civil Engineering is a bimonthly peer-reviewed scientific journal published by the American Society of Civil Engineers. It covers research specific to computing as it relates to civil engineering.

Abstracting and indexing
The journal is abstracted and indexed in Ei Compendex, Science Citation Index Expanded, ProQuest databases, Civil Engineering Database, Inspec, Scopus, and EBSCO databases.

References

External links

Civil engineering journals
American Society of Civil Engineers academic journals
Publications established in 1987